Azospirillum halopraeferens is a species of nitrogen-fixing bacteria associated with the roots of Diplachne fusca and black mangrove. It is microaerophilic and its type strain is Au 4 (= LMG 7108 =DSM 3675).

References

Further reading

External links

LPSN
Type strain of Azospirillum halopraeferens at BacDive -  the Bacterial Diversity Metadatabase

Rhodospirillales
Bacteria described in 1987